Bizineh Rud Rural District is in Bizineh Rud District of Khodabandeh County, Zanjan province, Iran. At the National Census of 2006, its population was 12,664 in 2,865 households. There were 13,209 inhabitants in 3,674 households at the following census of 2011. At the most recent census of 2016, the population of the rural district was 12,765 in 9,390 households. The largest of its 13 villages was Towzlu, with 2,307 people.

References 

Khodabandeh County

Rural Districts of Zanjan Province

Populated places in Zanjan Province

Populated places in Khodabandeh County